William Thomas Harris III (born September 22, 1940) is an American writer, best known for a series of suspense novels about his most famous character, Hannibal Lecter. The majority of his works have been adapted into films and television, the most notable being The Silence of the Lambs, which became only the third film in Academy Awards history to sweep the Oscars in major categories.

Biography
Harris was born in Jackson, Tennessee, but moved as a child with his family to Rich, Mississippi. He was introverted and bookish in grade school and then blossomed in high school. He attended Baylor University in Waco, Texas, where he majored in English and graduated in 1964. While in college, he worked as a reporter for the local newspaper, the Waco Tribune-Herald, covering the police beat. In 1968, he moved to New York City to work for Associated Press until 1974 when he began work on his debut novel, Black Sunday.

Personal life
Harris avoids publicity and conducted few interviews between 1976 and 2019. At Baylor University, he met and married Harriet Anne Haley, a fellow student, in June 1961. They had one daughter, Elizabeth Anne, before they divorced in August 1968. Harris remained close to his mother Polly and called her every night no matter where he was. He often discussed particular scenes from his novels with her. Polly died on December 31, 2011.

Harris lives in South Florida and has a summer home in Sag Harbor, New York. His long-term domestic partner is Pace Barnes, a woman who, according to USA Today, "used to work in publishing and is as outgoing as he is quiet". Harris' friend and literary agent Morton Janklow said of him: "He's one of the good guys. He is big, bearded and wonderfully jovial. If you met him, you would think he was a choirmaster. He loves cooking—he's done the Le Cordon Bleu exams—and it's great fun to sit with him in the kitchen while he prepares a meal and see that he's as happy as a clam. He has these old-fashioned manners, a courtliness you associate with the South." In his first major interview in 43 years, to The New York Times in 2019 to promote Cari Mora, he revealed himself to be a nature lover, and a long-time visitor and volunteer of the Pelican Harbor Seabird Station, an animal rescue center in Miami, Florida for 20 years. The staff were not aware of who Harris was until a few years prior to when the interview was conducted. He described fame as "more of a nuisance than anything else".

Approach to writing and critical reception
Fellow novelist Stephen King remarked that if writing is sometimes tedious for other authors, to Harris it is like "writhing on the floor in agonies of frustration", because for Harris, "the very act of writing is a kind of torment". Novelist John Dunning said of Harris, "All he is is a talent of the first rank." In 2019, he elaborated on his process, as well as the difficulty, describing it as "passive [...], sometimes you really have to shove and grunt and sweat. Some days you go to your office and you're the only one who shows up, none of the characters show up, and you sit there by yourself, feeling like an idiot. And some days everybody shows up ready to work. You have to show up at your office every day. If an idea comes by, you want to be there to get it in."

Bibliography
Black Sunday (1975)
Cari Mora (2019)

Dr. Hannibal Lecter
Hannibal Rising (2006)
Red Dragon (1981)
The Silence of the Lambs (1988)
Hannibal (1999)

Filmography
 Hannibal Rising (2007; screenplay)

See also
Hannibal Lecter (franchise)

References

Sources

 
 
  
 Dunning, John. Booked to Die. New York: Charles Scribner's Sons, 1992.
 
 
 Sexton, David. The Strange World of Thomas Harris. London: Short Books, 2001.

External links

1940s births
Living people
American crime fiction writers
American male novelists
American thriller writers
American psychological fiction writers
Baylor University alumni
Hannibal Lecter (franchise)
People from Jackson, Tennessee
People from Coahoma County, Mississippi
Writers from New York City
Novelists from Tennessee
Anthony Award winners
American male screenwriters
20th-century American novelists
21st-century American novelists
Novelists from New York (state)
Screenwriters from New York (state)
Screenwriters from Mississippi
20th-century American male writers
21st-century American male writers
Year of birth missing (living people)